Richard "Rick" Green,  BSc (born November 4, 1953) is a Canadian comedy writer, producer, director and performer.  He is most well known as co-creator of The Red Green Show, creator of ADD & Loving It?!, creator of History Bites, founder of Rick Wants to Know, and co-founder of comedy troupe The Frantics. Green also hosted Prisoners of Gravity on TVOntario.

Profiles
Rick holds a Bachelor of Science degree from the University of Waterloo. His first job was as a demonstrator at the Ontario Science Centre, where he worked as a presenter from 1975 until 1979.

In 1979, Green plunged into show business full-time when he helped found the Toronto-based comedy troupe The Frantics.

In 2009 Green wrote and directed a documentary entitled ADD & Loving it?!  The film, featuring fellow comedian Patrick McKenna, won a New York Festivals Silver World Medal for Best Medical Documentary and earned Green the CAMH Foundation Celebrity Transforming Lives Award for 2009.

Rick has been appointed to the Order of Ontario, and on June 30, 2017, the Governor General of Canada announced Green's appointment as a Member of the Order of Canada for "his contributions to Canadian television as a comedian, actor and writer, and for his efforts to raise awareness and understanding of attention deficit hyperactivity disorder (ADHD)."

See also
 List of University of Waterloo people

References

External links

 

1953 births
Canadian television hosts
Canadian television writers
Living people
University of Waterloo alumni
Canadian sketch comedians
Members of the Order of Ontario
Members of the Order of Canada
Canadian male comedians
Comedians from Toronto
Canadian Comedy Award winners
Canadian television producers
Canadian television directors